Frederick W. Pelton (March 24, 1827 – March 15, 1902) was mayor of Cleveland, Ohio from 1871 to 1872. He was a Republican, and served in the Union Army during the American Civil War.

Life and career
Pelton was born in Chester, Connecticut. His father moved the family to Brooklyn, Cuyahoga County, Ohio in 1825, where Frederick grew up. He married Susan Dennison, who grew up on the adjoining farm, on August 23, 1848.

At age 16, Pelton completed his education, and entered the office of Wheeler, Chamberlain & Company in Akron, where he remained for five years, before moving to Cleveland. In 1858 he entered the ship chandler business. During the American Civil War, he was a captain of the 8th Ohio Independent Battery.

From 1863, until his election as Cleveland mayor in 1871, Pelton was secretary of an insurance company, he was a member of city council, serving as president, and was treasurer of Cuyahoga County for two terms after being mayor.

Pelton was a founder of the Citizens' Saving & Loan Association, and a director until his death. He was president from 1893 until his death. He was also a director of several other S&Ls. He was a founder and director of the Riverside Cemetery Association.

Pelton was a thirty-third degree Mason, Odd Fellow, Knights of Pythias, the Methodist Episcopal Church, and member of the Grand Army of the Republic.

Pelton and his wife had seven children, two of whom survived him. he died at his Prospect Street home.

References

Mayors of Cleveland
1902 deaths
1827 births
Ohio Republicans
People from Chester, Connecticut
People of Ohio in the American Civil War
People from Brooklyn, Ohio